Toxic Waste is a split EP by American thrash metal bands Municipal Waste and Toxic Holocaust released under Tankcrimes Records. Tracks 1 and 2 are by Municipal Waste. Tracks 3 and 4 are by Toxic Holocaust.

Track listing

Personnel
Toxic Holocaust
 Joel Grind  — vocals, guitars
 Phil Zeller — bass, backing vocals
 Nick Bellmore — drums

Municipal Waste
 Tony Foresta — vocals
 Ryan Waste — guitar
 Land Phil — bass
 Dave Witte — drums

Production
 Andrei Bouzikov - Album cover art

2012 EPs
Toxic Holocaust albums
Municipal Waste (band) EPs
Split EPs